Tiny Colour Movies is a music album by John Foxx, released in 2006.

Background
Foxx attended a birthday celebration screening of a friend’s private film collection in Baltimore. The films in the collection were all short pieces collected from various sources, including surveillance agencies and Hollywood cutting room floors. Foxx was transfixed by the strangeness and beauty of the clips. 
A few weeks later, Foxx was working on some new pieces of music when he realized he was writing in the aftermath of the film screening. He gave in to the memories and wrote a small collection of musical pieces relating to his memory of the film clips he had seen.

Track listing
 "Stray Sinatra Neurone"
 "Lost New York"
 "Kurfürstendamm"
 "Skyscraper"
 "The Projectionist"
 "Looped Los Angeles"
 "Points of Departure"
 "X-Ray Vision"
 "Smokescreen"
 "Underwater Automobiles"
 "A Peripheral Character"
 "Shadow City"
 "Interlude"
 "Thought Experiment"
 "Hand-Held Skies"

Personnel
 John Foxx – All instruments
 Dallas Simpson – Mastering

References

John Foxx albums
2006 albums